Mount Hope Cemetery is a municipal cemetery located at 3751 Market Street, San Diego, California, and gives its name to the neighborhood of Mount Hope. The cemetery is adjacent to Greenwood Memorial Park.

History

Its design is an example of a rural cemetery, in architecture, art and landscaping. The city of San Diego manages and maintains it, providing perpetual care to all burial sites. The rolling hills contain monuments to some of the city's most notable former residents.

Notable interments

 E. S. Babcock (1848–1922), real estate mogul, built the Hotel del Coronado
 Samuel Brannan (1819–1889), early Mormon pioneer, first millionaire of the California Gold Rush, member of San Francisco's first city council
 Hick Carpenter (1855–1937), American baseball player
 Raymond Chandler (1888–1959), author of crime stories and novels, created detective Philip Marlowe
 Benjamin T. Frederick (1834–1903), politician, miner and real estate agent from Iowa and California
 Charles T. Hinde (1832–1915), industrialist, riverboat captain, businessman, and original investor of the Hotel del Coronado.
 Alonzo Horton (1813–1909), founder of modern San Diego, namesake of Horton Plaza
 Alta M. Hulett (1854–1877), one of America's first female attorneys
 John F. Kinney (1816–1902), American attorney, judge and politician
 George Marston (1850–1946), involved with establishing Balboa Park, the San Diego Public Library System, and the Serra Museum
 Kate Morgan (1865–1892), Iowa woman and purported ghost
 Kate Sessions (1857–1940), San Diego's pioneering horticulturist
 Matthew Sherman (1827–1898), land developer, San Diego pioneer, mayor from 1891 to 1893
 Walter R. Taliaferro (1880–1915), aviator
 Thomas Whaley (1823–1890), early settler
 Robert Waterman (1826–1891), Governor of California from 1887 to 1891

References

Further reading

External links
 Mount Hope Cemetery / Parks & Recreation
 
 Journal of San Diego History – San Diego Cemeteries: A Brief Guide
 

Cemeteries in San Diego County, California
Geography of San Diego
History of San Diego
 
1869 establishments in California